Poland participated in the Eurovision Song Contest 2022 in Turin, Italy, with "River" performed by Ochman. The Polish broadcaster  (TVP) first announced in September 2021 that the Polish entry for the 2022 contest would be chosen through an internal selection. However, the broadcaster later decided to organise the national final  in order to select the Polish entry. The national final took place on 19 February 2022 and featured ten entries. "River" performed by Ochman was selected as the winner following the combination of votes from a five-member jury panel and a public vote over two rounds of voting.

Poland was drawn to compete in the second semi-final of the Eurovision Song Contest which took place on 12 May 2022. Performing during the show in position 14, "River" was announced among the top 10 entries of the second semi-final and therefore qualified to compete in the final on 14 May. It was later revealed that Poland placed sixth out of the 18 participating countries in the semi-final with 198 points. In the final, Poland performed in position 23 and placed twelfth out of the 25 participating countries, scoring 151 points.

Background 

Between 2005 and 2011, Poland failed to qualify from the semi-final round six out of seven years with only their  entry, "For Life" performed by Isis Gee, managing to take the nation to the final during that period.

The Polish national broadcaster,  (TVP), broadcasts the event within Poland and organises the selection process for the nation's entry. TVP confirmed Poland's participation in the 2022 Eurovision Song Contest on 29 August 2021. The broadcaster opted to internally select the Polish entry for the 2021 Eurovision Song Contest, a selection procedure that was to be continued for their 2022 entry. The selected entry was scheduled to be presented by 2 January 2022, which was later delayed to 15 January 2022.

Before Eurovision

Tu bije serce Europy! Wybieramy hit na Eurowizję! 

 ("The heart of Europe beats here! We choose the hit for Eurovision!") was the national final organised by TVP in order to select the Polish entry for the Eurovision Song Contest 2022. The show was broadcast on TVP2 and TVP Polonia as well as on TVP Rozrywka with presentation in sign language and online via the platform TVP VOD. The national final was watched according to the Real Viewership Model was 2.3 million people with a market share of 12.6%. According to Nielsen Audience Measurement, the show attracted 1.9 million viewers and an average viewership of 1.7 million.

Competing entries 
TVP opened a submission period for interested artists and songwriters to submit their entries between 20 September 2021 and 20 November 2021. The broadcaster received 150 submissions at the closing of the deadline. A five-member selection committee consisting of a representative of TVP, a radio personality, a music expert, a journalist and a representative of the Polish Musicians Union selected ten entries from the received submissions to compete in the national final. The selected entries were announced on 14 January 2022 during the TVP2 programme . Among the competing artists was Lidia Kopania, who represented Poland in the Eurovision Song Contest 2009.

Final 
The final took place on 19 February 2022. Ten entries competed in the national final, with "River" performed by Krystian Ochman emerging victorious. The winner was determined over two rounds of voting: the first round selected the top three songs and the second round selected the winner. Results during both rounds were determined by a 50/50 combination of votes from a five-member professional jury and a public vote. Each juror distributed 100 points among all entries competing in the both rounds with the sum of all jury scores being converted into percentages, while viewers were able to cast a single vote via SMS. An average of the percentages of the jury and televotes for the songs was presented during both rounds of the voting. In the event of a tie, the tie was decided in favour of the jury. The jury that voted during the show consisted of Halina Frąckowiak, Krystian Kruczkowski, Marcin Kusy, Szymon Orłowski and Marek Sierocki. The jury voting was won by Daria, while the televote was won by Krystian Ochman.

In addition to the performances of the competing entries, a tribute to late singer Krzysztof Prusik and Azerbaijani 2011 Eurovision winners Ell and Nikki opened the show, while former Polish Eurovision entrants Justyna Steczkowska, Blue Café, Kasia Moś and Rafał Brzozowski, and former Polish Junior Eurovision entrants Viki Gabor and Sara James performed as the interval acts.

Controversy

Lidia Kopania's participation 
The final performance of the song "Why Does It Hurt?" by Lidia Kopania was widely commented on Polish media. It had been speculated that Kopania had forgotten the lyrics of her song, and her facial expressions and gestures during the performance showed that she was aware of the failed performance. The composers of the song, Ylva and Linda Persson, also accused the singer of sabotaging the song, adding that "a good song was wasted". When asked in interviews to comment on the matter, Kopania said that such a performance had been planned, and with the song she wanted to pay tribute to her deceased family members – her father, her brother and her father's sister. Later when asked by different media outlets, she stated that she had been inspired by Monty Python, and that she knew her performance would cause outrage. After the singer's performance, her fan-club founded 14 years prior was disbanded, with its founder informing about the singer's "notorious" lies and suggesting that she needed "treatment for her mental health, which had been damaged for some time." Ylva and Linda Persson were also accused of plagiarising the song "Glitter & Gold" by Rebecca Ferguson, while it was speculated Kopania had not been informed about the copyright infringement of the song.

Promotion 
Ochman made several appearances across Europe to specifically promote "River" as the Polish Eurovision entry. On 3 April, Ochman performed during the London Eurovision Party, which was held at the Hard Rock Hotel in London, United Kingdom and hosted by Paddy O'Connell and SuRie. On 7 April, Ochman performed during the Israel Calling event held at the Menora Mivtachim Arena in Tel Aviv, Israel. On 9 April, Ochman performed during the Eurovision in Concert event which was held at the AFAS Live venue in Amsterdam, Netherlands and hosted by Cornald Maas and Edsilia Rombley. On 16 April, Ochman performed during the PrePartyES 2022 event which was held at the Sala La Riviera venue in Madrid, Spain and hosted by Ruth Lorenzo. In addition to his international appearances, Ochman recorded his 'live-on-tape' performance at the Studio 5 of TVP in Warsaw on 21 March. This would have been used in the event that he was unable to travel to Turin, or subjected to quarantine on arrival.

At Eurovision 

According to Eurovision rules, all nations with the exceptions of the host country and the "Big Five" (France, Germany, Italy, Spain and the United Kingdom) are required to qualify from one of two semi-finals in order to compete for the final; the top ten countries from each semi-final progress to the final. The European Broadcasting Union (EBU) split up the competing countries into six different pots based on voting patterns from previous contests, with countries with favourable voting histories put into the same pot. On 25 January 2022, an allocation draw was held which placed each country into one of the two semi-finals, as well as which half of the show they would perform in. Poland was placed into the second semi-final, held on 12 May 2022, and was scheduled to perform in the second half of the show.

During his performance, Ochman wore a black suit. He was joined by four contemporary dancers wearing all-black clothing and masks, described by the official Eurovision website as looking "like ghosts", giving the performance "a powerful, yet haunting visual". Ochman's performance featured flashing light effects, with predominantly dark blue staging. Ochman himself commented on the performance, saying: "The dancers are posing as demons. The whole concept of the song is getting to the moment of inner peace, but getting away from the noise and the demons". The predominant colour in the Polish performance was black and dark blue. The performance also featured visual effects, consisting of a storm-like overlay projected on-screen and sounds of rain hitting the ground, which was met with criticism from Polish Eurovision fans, who called them "unnecessary" and "kitschy". The performance also included other elements that were criticised, namely the idea of Ochman's face being projected on the back LED displays, as well as his suit.

Once all the competing songs for the 2022 contest had been released, the running order for the semi-finals was decided by the shows' producers rather than through another draw, so that similar songs were not placed next to each other. Poland qualified for the final and was announced fourth. Shortly after the second semi-final, a winners' press conference was held for the ten qualifying countries. As part of this press conference, the qualifying artists took part in a draw to determine which half of the grand final they would subsequently participate in. This draw was done in the order the countries appeared in the semi-final running order. Poland was drawn to compete in the second half. Following this draw, the shows' producers decided upon the running order of the final, as they had done for the semi-finals. Poland was subsequently placed to perform in position 23, following the entry from the United Kingdom and before the entry from Serbia. In the grand final, Poland finished in position 12 with 151 points – the country's best placing since Michał Szpak's 8th place, achieved in 2016. Poland also managed to reach its best result in the semi-finals in the history of the country in the contest, having achieved 6th place with 198 points. Poland had also previously scored 6th in the semi-final in 2016, but received less points.

The Polish spokesperson, who announced the top 12-point score awarded by the Polish jury during the final, was Ida Nowakowska, who had previously announced the points for Poland in 2021. Controversy surrounded the point announcement as social media posts alleged that Nowakowska had performed a Nazi salute during her segment. That allegation was disproven by Reuters, which stated that Nowakowska hadn't done the salute, but instead showed a peace sign.

Voting

Points awarded to Poland

Points awarded by Poland

Jury vote issues 
In a statement released during the broadcast of the grand final, the EBU revealed that six countries, including Poland, were found to have irregular jury voting patterns during the second semi-final. Consequently, these countries were given substitute aggregated jury scores for both the second semi-final and the grand final (shown above), calculated from the corresponding jury scores of countries with historically similar voting patterns as determined by the pots for the semi-final allocation draw held in January.  Their televoting scores were unaffected. The Flemish broadcaster VRT later reported that the juries involved had made agreements to vote for each other's entries to secure qualification to the grand final.

On 19 May, the EBU released a further statement clarifying the irregularities in voting patterns. This confirmed that the six countries involved had consistently scored each other's entries disproportionately highly in the second semi-final: the Polish jury, as well as the juries from Azerbaijan, Georgia, Montenegro, Romania and San Marino, had each ranked the other five countries' entries as their top five, proving beyond statistical coincidence that they had colluded to achieve a higher placing. This prompted the suspension of Poland's intended jury scores (shown below) in favour of the EBU's calculated aggregate scores, presented above. The Polish broadcaster TVP commented on the situation, strongly rejecting the accusations of vote manipulation and criticising the EBU's method of calculating the aggregate jury scores. The statement went on to request further transparency from the EBU over the issue.

Detailed final results 
The EBU published these detailed results for a short time on 13 July 2022.

References 

2022
Countries in the Eurovision Song Contest 2022
Eurovision
Eurovision